Cristian Felipe Pulido Gálvez (born 20 July 1991) is a Colombian footballer who plays for Fortaleza C.E.I.F. as a forward.

Club career
Pulido was born in Trujillo, Valle del Cauca, and represented Deportes Tuluá and Cortuluá as a youth. He made his senior debut in 2012 while playing for Bolivia's Club Petrolero.

Pulido only returned to his home country in 2014, signing for Real Cartagena. After a brief stint at former club Cortuluá he returned to Bolivia, joining Real Potosí in June 2015; he rescinded with the latter in September.

On 24 June 2016 Pulido moved to Club San José. On 16 July, however, he switched teams and countries again after agreeing to a one-year contract with Spanish Segunda División B club CF Rayo Majadahonda.

References

External links

1991 births
Living people
Sportspeople from Valle del Cauca Department
Colombian footballers
Association football forwards
Categoría Primera A players
Categoría Primera B players
Real Cartagena footballers
Fortaleza C.E.I.F. footballers
Cortuluá footballers
Bolivian Primera División players
Club San José players
Segunda División B players
CF Rayo Majadahonda players
Colombian expatriate footballers
Colombian expatriate sportspeople in Bolivia
Colombian expatriate sportspeople in Spain
Expatriate footballers in Bolivia
Expatriate footballers in Spain